Argyreia cuneata is a perennial climbing shrub which is native to the Indian subcontinent and is related to Argyreia nervosa.

Common names include purple morning glory, mahalungi, and kallana gida.

Description
Argyreia cuneata is a perennial climbing shrub growing from 150–200 cm. Its stems are covered with soft white hair. The leaves are about 6 centimeters long by 2.5 wide with wedge-shaped bases. The flowers are purple and about 5 cm long. The seeds are brown, about 1 cm long, and elliptically shaped.

Toxicity
Like those of Argyreia nervosa, the seeds of A. cuneata contain various ergoline alkaloids such as chanoclavines and lysergic acid amides.

Medicinal uses
The leaves are traditionally used for treatment of diabetes.

References

cuneata
Flora of India (region)
Medicinal plants of Asia